The 2018 UC Davis Aggies softball team represented the University of California, Davis in the 2018 NCAA Division I softball season. The Aggies were coached by Erin Thorpe in her fourth season, playing their home games at La Rue Field. They finished 27–24 overall and tied for fourth place in the Big West Conference with a 9–12 record.

Freshman pitcher Brooke Yanez was named the Big West Freshman Pitcher of the Year after she posted a 15–11 record, a 1.75 ERA and 190 strikeouts in 187.2 innings. She was profiled in a ESPNW.com feature on freshman starting pitchers in February, and both Yanez and freshman utility player Alyse Rojas earned first-team all-conference honors at the conclusion of the season. 

The Aggies set numerous single-season Division I program records during the season. As a team, they established new records in wins (27), winning percentage (.529), and fielding percentage (.969). Individually, Yanez set a new mark in ERA while Rojas set a new record in batting average (.372).

Previous season
The Aggies finished the 2017 season 22–32 overall, 7–14 in Big West play to finish eighth in the conference.

Preseason

Big West Conference coaches poll
The Big West Conference coaches poll was released on February 1, 2018. UC Davis was picked to finish eighth in the Big West Conference with 12 votes.

Roster

Source:

Schedule

Awards and honors

References

UC Davis Aggies
UC Davis Aggies softball seasons
UC Davis Aggies softball